Neo-Baroque film is a type of film theory that (while the term "neo-baroque" is borrowed from the writings of semiologist Umberto Eco and philosopher Gilles Deleuze) used in film studies to describe certain films, television shows and Hollywood blockbusters characterised by the excessively ornate, carnivalesque fragmentation of the film frame and/or narrative, sometimes to the point of spatial and/or narrative incoherence.

Notable films associated with Neo-Baroque cinema
La dolce vita (1960)
8 1/2 (1963)
Amarcord (1973)
Close Encounters of the Third Kind (1977)
Star Wars (1977)
The Evil Dead series (1981-1992)
Mad Max: Beyond Thunderdome (1985)
Jurassic Park (1993)
Contact (1997)
Event Horizon (1997)
Moulin Rouge (2001)
Avatar (2009)

Notable directors associated with Neo-Baroque cinema
Peter Greenaway
Sally Potter 
Raúl Ruiz
Claire Denis
Steven Spielberg
Sam Raimi
Pedro Almodovar
Baz Luhrmann
James Cameron
Luc Besson
Federico Fellini

See also

 Baroque
 Experimental film
 Oneiric (film theory)
 Vulgar auteurism
 Philosophy of film
 Postmodernist film
 Surrealist film

Further reading
 Omar Calabrese (1992). Neo-Baroque: A Sign of the Times, tr. Charles Lambert (Princeton University Press).
 Sean Cubitt (2004). The Cinema Effect (MIT Press), pp. 217–244.
 Gilles Deleuze (1988). The Fold: Leibniz and the Baroque, tr. Tom Conley (University of Minnesota Press, 1993).
 Umberto Eco (1962). The Open Work, tr. Anna Cancogni (Harvard University Press, 1989).
 Monika Kaup (2012). Neobaroque in the Americas: Alternative Modernities in Literature, Visual Art, and Film (University of Virginia Press).
 Walter Moser, Angela Ndalianis and Peter Krieger, eds. (2016). Neo-Baroques: From Latin America to the Hollywood Blockbuster (Brill/Rodop).
 Angela Ndalianis (2004). Neo-Baroque Aesthetics and Contemporary Entertainment (MIT Press).
 Emmanuel Plasseraud (2007). Cinéma et imaginaire baroque (Septentrion).
 Saige Walton (2016). Cinema's Baroque Flesh: Film, Phenomenology and the Art of Entanglement (Amsterdam University Press).
 Peter Wollen (1993). "Baroque and Neo-Baroque in the Age of Spectacle," Point of Contact 3 (3), pp. 9–21.

References

Concepts in film theory
Film styles
Film theory
History of film
1960s in film
1970s in film
1980s in film
1990s in film
2000s in film